Leveson is a surname. The name as printed can represent two quite different etymologies and pronunciations:

A Leveson family who were Merchants of the Staple became very influential in Wolverhampton in the late Middle Ages, supplying both lay support and clergy to St Peter's Collegiate Church. They were the ancestors of a number of important landed gentry and peers, in various branches, including the Leveson-Gowers. Their name could be rendered in numerous ways in the early modern period: Levison, Leweson, and Luson are all common. To modern readers, the latter represents the pronunciation most accurately. An example of its use is a letter to Robert Cecil, dated 5 August 1602, which reports that "eight of the galleys which fought with Sir Richard Luson were repaired." Leveson is an example of an English surname with counterintuitive pronunciation. It is a patronymic from Louis or Lewis.
Leveson can also be a patronymic from the Hebrew name Levi, and so is most found among Ashkenazi families.

Notable people called Leveson
Sir Walter Leveson (d.1602), Shropshire and Staffordshire landowner and MP
Sir Richard Leveson (c.1570 – 2 August 1605), MP for Shropshire, fought in the Armada campaign
Sir John Leveson (d.1613)
Sir John Leveson (21 March 1555 – 14 November 1615)
William Leveson, (d.1621)
Richard Leveson (1598–1661), English politician who sat in the House of Commons from 1640 to 1642 and was a prominent royalist in the English Civil War.
Arthur Leveson GCB (1868–1929), senior officer in the Royal Navy
Brian Leveson QC, (born 1949), English judge in the Court of Appeal and head of the Sentencing Council for England and Wales
Leveson Inquiry into the British press following the News International phone hacking scandal
Nancy Leveson, leading American expert in system and software safety

See also
Leveson Inquiry
Leveson-Gower
Levison

References

Patronymic surnames
Jewish surnames
Yiddish-language surnames